Owl Creek is a tributary of Lone Tree Creek in Weld County, Colorado. The creek flows south from a source near the northern border of Weld County to a confluence with Lone Tree Creek east of Eaton.

See also
List of rivers of Colorado

References

Rivers of Weld County, Colorado
Rivers of Colorado
Tributaries of the Platte River